Monxton is a village and civil parish in Hampshire, England. It lies 3 miles west of Andover near the A303 road. It had one pub, named the Black Swan, which is now permanently closed.

References

Villages in Hampshire
Test Valley